The House of Commons Standing Committee on Government Operations and Estimates (OGGO) is a standing committee of the House of Commons of Canada.

Mandate
Review the effectiveness of government operations
Review expenditure budgets of central departments and agencies
Examine all estimates documents
Co-ordinate cross-departmental mandates
Approve new information and communication technologies adopted by the government
Review statutory programs, tax expenditures, loan guaranties and contingency funds
Regulate private foundations deriving the majority of their funding from the federal government
Examine and conduct studies related to the following federal organizations:
The Privy Council Office
The Prime Minister's Office
The Treasury Board Secretariat
Public Works and Government Services Canada
The Public Services Human Resources Management Agency of Canada
The Canada School of Public Service
The Office of the Governor-General of Canada
The Public Service Labour Relations Board
The Canadian Intergovernmental Conference Secretariat
The Canada Lands Company
The Canada Mortgage and Housing Corporation
The Canada Post Corporation
Defence Construction (1951) Ltd.
Old Port of Montréal Corporation Inc.
The Public Sector Pension Investment Board
Queens Quay West Land Corp.
The Royal Canadian Mint

Membership

Subcommittees
Subcommittee on Agenda and Procedure (SOGG)

References
Standing Committee on Government Operations and Estimates (OGGO)

Government Operations